Gantry is a musical with a book by Peter Bellwood, lyrics by Fred Tobias, and music by Stanley Lebowsky.

Based on the 1927 novel Elmer Gantry by Sinclair Lewis, it tells the story of a womanizing, self-righteous, self-proclaimed preacher who joins forces with a female evangelist to sell religion to small-town Americans.

After 31 previews, the Broadway production, directed and choreographed by Onna White, opened on February 14, 1970 at the George Abbott Theatre, where it closed after one performance. The cast included Robert Shaw, Rita Moreno, Ted Thurston, and Beth Fowler.

Song list  
Act I      
 Wave a Hand
 He Was There
 Play Ball with the Lord
 Katie Jonas
 Thanks, Sweet Jesus!
 Someone I've Already Found
 He's Never Too Busy
 We're Sharin' Sharon 

Act II      
 We Can All Give Love
 Foresight
 These Four Walls
 Show Him the Way
 The Promise of What I Could Be
 Gantry's Reaction
 We're Sharin' Sharon (Reprise)

External links
 

1970 musicals
Broadway musicals
Sinclair Lewis
Musicals based on novels